Al-'Amal (in Arabic العمل) was a weekly newspaper published in Aden from 1957. Al-'Amal was the organ of the Aden Trade Union Congress (ATUC). The newspaper was only allowed to print 1,500 copies weekly by the authorities. The newspaper carried the slogan 'Freedom, Bread and Peace'. After a year of existence, and had the same editor as al-Ba'ath. Al Amal was banned for having fomented dissent amongst workers.

ATUC later launched al-'Ummal (in Arabic العمال meaning The Workers) as its new organ.

Amin Al Aswadi served as the editor-in-chief of the newspaper.

References

Publications established in 1957
Defunct newspapers published in Yemen
Arabic-language newspapers
Mass media in Aden
20th-century establishments in the Colony of Aden
Defunct weekly newspapers
1957 establishments in Asia
1957 establishments in the British Empire